Shahid Talebi Dam is a hydroelectric dam in Iran with an installed electricity generating capability of 2.3 MWh. It is situated in town of Sepidan in Fars Province and first came online in 1994, after three years of construction.

See also
List of power stations in Iran

References

Dams in Fars Province
Dams completed in 1994
Buildings and structures in Fars Province